Youngsbury House is a Grade II listed house near Wadesmill, Hertfordshire, England. The stable block is Grade II* listed.

The house was built in about 1745 by David Poole, with 97 acres of grounds, and gardens landscaped by Capability Brown.

People connected with it
David Barclay, the Quaker banker and abolitionist, bought the manor in 1769, and enlarged the house. A plan by Capability Brown the following year introduced a serpentine lake. Barclay sold it in 1793, after the death of his second wife, to William Cunliffe Shawe, and it passed in 1796 to Daniel Giles.

In 2012, it was for sale, "offers in excess of £3,900,000". As of 2015, it was owned by Jeremy Langmead, the former editor of Wallpaper* magazine and Esquire magazin, who used to be married to writer India Knight. In 2017 it was sold to James and Claire Pearce who plan to restore it to its original state and use it as a family home for them and their three children.  It took nearly three years to obtain all the required Planning and other permissions. However, the house itself was completed in February 2023 and the family occupied it.  The gardens and other nearby features are to be completed, although the parkland remains open to walkers.

References

Grade II listed buildings in Hertfordshire
Grade II* listed buildings in Hertfordshire
Houses completed in 1745
Grade II listed houses
Country houses in Hertfordshire
Gardens by Capability Brown
Grade II* listed agricultural buildings